Christopher Charles Hawkins (born 23 September 1975) is a British radio presenter, DJ, and music pundit.

Hawkins is a regular early morning presenter on BBC Radio 6 Music. He can also be heard presenting documentary programmes on BBC Radio 4 and makes occasional appearances on BBC Radio 2 and BBC Radio 5 live.

He makes frequent TV appearances as a personality pundit and pop-culture expert.

Early life and education
Hawkins was born in Loppington, Shropshire, England. He studied at the University of Nottingham, where he obtained a degree in American Studies, and spent some time at Middlebury College in the United States as an exchange student. Also, as a school boy at the independent school Ellesmere College in Ellesmere, Shropshire, he spent some time at the Tabor Academy in the United States, on an English-Speaking Union scholarship.

Career 
Hawkins started his radio career on BBC Radio Shropshire. He went on to BBC Radio Nottingham and BBC GLR.

He has worked for the BBC World Service doing the UK Album Chart Show and the UK Top 20, presented a daily show on GLR 94.9 (BBC London 94.9) for over two years, Talk Radio UK as a reporter and producer, BBC London Live, Real Radio, American College Radio, Jazz FM in London and Classic Gold.

He co-presented a radio talk show with psychic Becky Walsh on Friday nights on LBC 97.3 FM radio and had his own show on LBC 97.3 on Saturday afternoons.
Hawkins has appeared on Celebrity Mastermind (his specialist subject was Coronation Street), he represented the University of Nottingham on Celebrity University Challenge, winning their heat, but failing to make the semi-finals.

He writes a music column for London magazines, including the music review section of Angel magazine.

Personal life 
Hawkins is married to meteorologist Clare Nasir, with whom he had a child in 2009. In 2012, the family moved up to Wilmslow near Salford City and MediaCityUK where Hawkins continued working for BBC Radio 6 Music.

Hawkins is an ambassador for The Prince's Trust.

His lifelong phobia of fruit and vegetables was the topic of a 2008 edition of BBC Three's Freaky Eaters.

Notes

External links
 Chris Hawkins (BBC Radio 6 Music)
 The Remix with Chris Hawkins (BBC Radio 6 Music)
 
 
 
 Chris Hawkins Official Home on the Web (archived 2016)
 Old Ellesmerian Club article on Chris Hawkins – June 2005, p. 19

1975 births
Living people
People educated at Ellesmere College
Alumni of the University of Nottingham
British radio personalities
British radio DJs
BBC Radio 6 Music presenters
BBC Radio 2 presenters
Television personalities from Shropshire
Tabor Academy (Massachusetts) alumni